Consolo is an Italian surname. Notable people with this surname include:

 Benjamin Consolo (1806–1887), Italian translator
 Billy Consolo (1934–2008), American baseball player
 Bonnie Consolo (1938–2005), American motivational speaker
 Federico Consolo (1841–1906), Italian violinist and composer
 Vincenzo Consolo (1933–2012), Italian writer